Pita is a bread.

Pita or PITA may also refer to:

Places
 Pita, Guinea
 Pitas, Malaysia

People
 Pita (name), list of people with the name

Other uses
 Pita, a type of pastry in Greek and Balkan cuisine similar to burek
 Pita, fibers from a century plant
 Pita (1991 film), a Hindi film
 Pita (2012 film), a Bangladeshi film
 Prevention of Immoral Trafficking Act, legislation in India
 Provincial Institute of Technology and Art, Alberta, Canada

See also
 Peta (disambiguation)
 Pihta, a type of sacramental bread used in Mandaean rituals
 Pitha, a type of rice cake
 Pitta (disambiguation)